Colyford is a village in East Devon, England situated midway between Lyme Regis and Sidmouth on the A3052 road. To the north the village borders the town of Colyton and lies within the latter's civil parish boundaries. To the south is the seaside resort town of Seaton, separated from Colyford by the Seaton Wetlands, a series of nature reserves flanking the estuary of the River Axe. Colyford lies on the River Coly, which flows into the River Axe immediately to the east of the village.

Colyford was formerly an Ancient Borough of long-standing and still elects a Mayor.

Features
Colyford is served by St Michael's Church.  There is also a post office, a butcher and two pubs.

Colyton Grammar School dates from 1546 and made headlines in recent years as the first school to 'opt out' of local authority control and gain grant-maintained status and for achieving very high rankings in national examination league tables.

Colyford is home to a petrol filling station built in 1927–8. Although it no longer sells fuel, the filling station still displays 1950's petrol pumps.

Transport

Tram 

Seaton Tramway runs over part of the former Seaton Branch line between Seaton, Colyford and Colyton. The branch closed in 1966, and tram services from Riverside commenced in August 1970, reaching Colyford in April 1971. Journey times from Colyford station are 15 minutes to Seaton and 10 minutes to Colyton. The Tramway operates a daily service from Easter to the end of October and a more limited service outside of this period.

Bus 
Colyford is served by AVMT Buses' service 885 that runs between Beer & Axminster via Seaton & Colyton. Dartline 20 also serves Colyford between Seaton and Taunton via Honiton.

References

External links 

 colyfordvillage.co.uk - City Colyford's website

Villages in Devon